Rokometno društvo Koper 2013 or simply RD Koper 2013 is a handball club from Koper, Slovenia. The team was founded in 2013. They play their home games at Arena Bonifika.

Club history
RD Koper 2013 was founded in 2013 when the old club, RK Koper, was dissolved due to bankruptcy.

Honours

League
Slovenian Second Division
Winners: 2014–15

Slovenian Third Division
Winners: 2013–14

Cup
Slovenian Cup
Runners-up: 2015–16

Slovenian Supercup
Runners-up: 2016

References

External links
Official website 

Handball clubs established in 2013
2013 establishments in Slovenia
Slovenian handball clubs
Sport in Koper